Desisa kuraruana is a species of beetle in the family Cerambycidae. It was described by Masaki Matsushita in 1935.

References

Desisa
Beetles described in 1935